Roundnet (also commonly known as spikeball) is a net sport. The game is played between two teams, usually with two players each. Players initially line up around a small trampoline-like net at the start of a point. The game starts with a serve from one team to another, and teams alternate hitting the ball back to the net, and ends when the ball falls to the ground or an infraction occurs.

Roundnet was originally created in 1989 by Jeff Knurek, inspired primarily by concepts from volleyball, although the equipment he created for the game became outdated and lost popularity in 1995. The sport experienced a revival in 2008 when Spikeball Inc. began promoting it. The company manufactures equipment for the sport, and so "spikeball" became a common name for the sport.

Basics
Roundnet features elements from many other sports such as volleyball and four square. The game is played between two teams of two people. Players are positioned at 4 points around the net, with partners located at neighboring positions. One player serves the ball across the net to the opposing team member. The opposing team then has 3 hits to return the ball to the net. After the serve, there are no boundaries of play. Participants are free to run, set, and spike the ball from anywhere around the net. Play continues until a team fails to return the ball or the ball hits a rim piece, at which point the point ends, and the other team receives 1 point.

Rules

Source:

The bouncing ball has a 12-inch circumference (approximately 3.8-inch diameter).

Setup 
Materials needed for roundnet include a trampoline-like net, and a small ball with a 12-inch circumference. Players line up in a square around the net with their partner to one side, and a member of the opposing team on the other. Each partner is ninety degrees away from the next player. Before the point starts, players will always be across the net from an opponent and next to their teammate.

Each point begins with a serve, usually done by the team who won the previous point. To determine who serves first in the match, teams will play a game of rock paper scissors with the winner of the rock paper scissors game receiving the option to serve first or receive first. During the serve, all players who are not receiving the serve have to line up in their designated positions outside of 6 feet from their section of the rim. The returner can stand wherever they want prior to the serve.

Once the ball is served, all players on both teams can move wherever they may like. After the ball is served, the possession is assumed by the returning team. Once the ball is hit and returned by the non-serving team and hits the net, the possession is flipped. This continues throughout the point, as possession changes whenever the ball hits the net. During each possession, teams have three hits but do not have to use all of their hits.

To account for harsh sunlight, wind, or any other condition outside of the game; players will rotate serving positions ninety degrees every five points. Only a maximum of three touches are permitted.

Serving 
The first serve starts the game, and the setup is dictated by the first receiver. The server then stands directly across from the receiver, and only the designated receiver may receive the serve. To serve, the server must throw the ball at least 4 inches away from the release point to begin the serve. The first hit from the server should always be a gentlemen's serve, meaning that the serve should not be used with excessive force but rather with a friendly start to get the game going smoothly. The ball is not allowed to be interfered with during the serve.

For each point, the server is allowed two serves to complete a legal serve. If they catch, swing at and miss, or drop the tossed ball, it results in a service fault. Servers must be behind the six-foot line away from the net to be eligible for the play. The server cannot lean over the line in order to get closer to the net, and their feet and entire body must be behind the line until the ball is contacted. The server is allowed to take a pivot step, but cannot move further than a pivot. The server can hit the ball at any speed and direction including drop shots. For the serve to be eligible, the ball must not go any higher than the receiver's raised hand. If the ball does this, the receivers must call fault before a second touch occurs or the ball hits the ground. The serving team will have one more try to serve it correctly, or they lose the point. When serving, if the ball hits what is known as a "pocket" (the area of the net that is right next to the rim) then the receiving team can call a fault and the server can attempt another serve. If the ball comes in contact with the rim at any point of the game while a player attempts to hit the net, that is a point for the opposing team. If a fault is not called, then the play continues. If two faults occur back to back, the receiving team is awarded the point and possession switches sides. If the serving team wins the point, the server must switch places with their teammate to serve to the other receiver. If the receiving team wins the point, they get to serve the next point.

Contacting the ball 
Rules and regulations exist when the ball is in play. If a player contacts the ball on its trajectory upward, a soft touch can be made. A soft touch allows the same player to hit the ball a second time in a row, if the first touch is on an upward path. However, this second touch does indeed count for 2/3 of the max touches by a team, and the next hit must go on the net. When a player is hitting the ball, no more than a slight carry is allowed by SRA. Any catch of the ball results in a point for the opposing team. If the ball hits the ground or the rim at any point during the rally, the play ends and a point is given to the other team. If the teams could not determine whether the ball hit the rim or a pocket, the play is replayed. When the ball hits the net, it must clear the rim for the play to be continued. If the ball hits the net again, a double bounce is called, and a point is given to the assuming receiving team. If during a rally the ball hits the pocket, the rally continues. Pockets are only a fault during serves. If the ball makes contact with the net and then proceeds to roll up into the rim, this is known as a "roll-up". If this occurs during a service, the receiving team may call a fault and the service is tried again. If a roll-up occurs during a rally, it is treated as a pocket, and the rally continues.

Infractions exist even if a team does not have assumed possession, these are called hinders. These include if a defensive player gets in the way of the team going for the ball. It is required that defensive players make an effort to get out of the way to avoid interference. If a player gets in the way of the play, the opposing team must call it "hinder". They will then be able to replay the point. The offensive team must have a legitimate reason to call "hinder". If the defensive player makes an attempt to play at the ball if they do not have possession, they lose the point. If a player hits a shot that hits off the net and hits either themselves or their teammate, they lose the point. If a player makes contact with the set, it results in the loss of the point. Even if the player hit a "kill shot", they will lose the point if they touch the set before the ball makes contact with the ground.

Scoring 

Scoring in roundnet is dictated by "rally scoring", meaning that a team may earn a point whether they are serving or not. Games are usually played from 11, 15 or 21 points, but the tournament organizer can change that at his/her discretion. As is common with similar games such as ping-pong, tennis, and volleyball, teams can only win by two points. This can lead to deuces and point-advantages until a team wins by 2 points. Points can be scored in these ways:

 When the ball does not hit the net within three hits during a possession
 The ball hits the ground
 The ball hits the rim. (This includes during serves)
 The ball does not bounce off the net on a single bounce, also known as a double hit. The ball must clear the rim of the net completely.
 There are two illegal serves in a row.
 The player hits themselves or their teammate with the ball after it makes contact with the net

Modified Rules 

In addition to the original, classic way of playing roundnet, there are many variations that can be made to the rules of the game, some of which have become more and more popular. These modifications can add a complete different aspect to a simple game of roundnet, and in doing so transform the game as a whole. Adding extra aspects to the game allows for roundnet players to challenge themselves a little extra, and in doing so either increase or decrease the competitive aspect of such a versatile sport like roundnet. Some potential modifications include splitting the play field in half (thus simplifying the game), only using one hand, or even forcing players to hold hands greatly increasing the difficulty of the game.

Skills 
Many competitive teams and players master these four fundamental skills: serve, pass/dig/set, attack (spike), and the body block. These skills are standard practice for high-level advanced, premier, or pro division players.

Serve 
The server stands behind the 7 foot serving line, in attempt to hit the ball onto the net. The servers main goal is to hit a clean serve that will result in a bad touch or a possible "ace". A serve is called an "ace" when the server hits the ball onto the net, bounces off clean, and the ball goes untouched by the receiver and hits the ground, or the ball hits the ground before the receiver can touch it, or the receiver has a bad touch and the ball goes off in a different direction, resulting in the ball hitting the ground.

In present-day roundnet, several types of serves are implemented:

 Basic serve: Used by most beginners. When a player hits the ball with a flat hand giving the ball little to no spin. The basic serve is rarely used in high-level games and tournaments, because of how easy the serve is to receive. Can be performed in any serving stance
 Topspin/Jam/Backdoor serve: The most commonly used serve in the sport of roundnet. It is when the player tosses the ball and hits the ball with top spin, which makes the ball go shooting forward at the receiver. When hit hard this serve can be extremely difficult to receive. This serve can be performed in multiple serving stances.
 Drop serve: Another very commonly used serve in the sport of roundnet. When the player tosses the ball and hits the ball with a bit of back spin, which results in the ball dropping in-front of the receiver. When the serve is placed properly it can be extremely difficult to defend if the opposing player is further back while receiving the hard driven serves. This serve can be performed in multiple serving stances.
 Cut serve: Used by advanced-level players, the server tosses the ball and hits the ball with side spin and top spin, making the ball bounce off the net wider than expected by the receiver. When this serve is placed on the net with tons of power and spin it can be extremely hard for the receiver to get a touch. This serve can be used in most stances, may be more difficult for certain stances.
 Reverse-cut serve: Perhaps the most difficult serve to master. The server hits the ball with reverse spin going clockwise(assuming right-handedness) as opposed to a typical cut serve, which spins counterclockwise.

Pass/dig/set 
A pass or a dig is used to properly receive the opponents serve or any type of hit. To properly handle the serve or hit, the player not only has to prevent it from hitting the ground, but also wants to give their partner a good pass to allow them to create a good set.

There are two different techniques used to pass the ball, they can be used in different circumstances:

 Under hand pass: When the player makes a platform with their hand for the ball to bounce off the palm of their hand. Most commonly used for setting for a partner.
 Over head pass: Essentially the same contact with the under hand pass, but pushing the ball over head. Most commonly used when receiving the serve and hard driven hits, long distance setting, or when the ball is traveling over head.

Attack (spiking) 
A hit/flick/chip/drop is used when a player is attacking the ball; it is an attempt to give their opponent a hard hit to defend so they are unable to get the ball back onto the net. Players usually use a combination of wrist snap, arm swing and rotation to deliver certain types of attacks. The main goal of the hitter is to get a "kill". A "kill" is a term used when ball is hit and bounces off the net, and the opposing team could not dig the ball, resulting in a point.

In present-day roundnet there are many different ways to attack the ball:

 Hit(spike): A hard driven hit usually performed with topspin.
 Flick: A very low trajectory shot to place the ball where the defender is not. This is a placement shot. Typically done with a backhand motion. 
 Chorn: A high and far trajectory shot to place the ball overhead of the defender, being unreachable then landing very far away from the net. Sometimes referred to as a chip or skyball. 
 Drop: A low trajectory shot placed in front of the defender. This attack is used with minimal amounts of force.
 Pull: A shot that’s trajectory is toward the direction of the hitter
 Push: A shot that’s trajectory is directly in front of the hitter. 
 Tweener: A shot delivered from between the hitters legs.

Body block 
A body block is a common tactic for defence. Where the player defending a hard driven shot, gets hit with ball, passing the ball up to his partner for a set. Body blocks can also be used to block the ball back onto the net, this is referred to a "God-(hand, body, knee, or block etc)". A "God-block" is when a player uses any part of their body, for example their hand, to deflect the ball back onto the net in one touch usually resulting in a "kill", in this case it would be called a "God-hand".

References 

Volleyball variations
Games and sports introduced in 1989